Moghavemat Shiraz F.C. or Moghavemat Fars F.C. may refer to:

 Moghavemat Sepasi Fars F.C., an Iran Pro League club, formerly known as Fajr Sepasi F.C., based in Shiraz, Fars
 Moghavemat Basij Shiraz F.C., an Azadegan League club, formerly known as Mersad Shiraz F.C., based in Shiraz, Fars